General Sir Garrett O'Moore Creagh,  (2 April 1848 – 9 August 1923), known as Sir O'Moore Creagh, was a senior British Army officer and an Irish recipient of the Victoria Cross, the highest award for gallantry in the face of the enemy that can be awarded to British and Commonwealth forces.

Early life and family
Creagh was born in Cahirbane, County Clare, on 2 April 1848, the seventh  son of Captain James Creagh, an officer of the Royal Navy, and his wife, Grace O'Moore.

Creagh was married twice, firstly to Mary Longfield (or possibly Brereton) in 1874, who died in 1876, and then to Elizabeth Reade in 1891. He had three children, one of whom was Major General Sir Michael Creagh.

In 1866, after training at the Royal Military College, Sandhurst, Creagh was commissioned into the 95th (Derbyshire) Regiment of Foot and in 1869 was posted to India, being transferred to the British Indian Army the next year.

Second Anglo-Afghan War
Creagh was 31 years old, and a captain in the Bombay Staff Corps during the Second Anglo-Afghan War, when the following deed on 22 April 1879 at Kam Dakka, on the Kabul River, Afghanistan, took place for which he was awarded the VC:

Later career
In 1878 he became captain of the Merwara battalion, commanding them from 1882 until 1886. He assumed command of the 29th (Duke of Connaught's Own) Bombay Infantry (2nd Baluch Battalion) in 1890, and was promoted to Assistant Quarter-master General in 1896. He commanded the Indian contingent during the Boxer Rebellion in China in 1900, and was in July 1901 appointed General Officer Commanding the British Force in China after the departure of General Alfred Gaselee. He stayed in China for several years, and a report on the field operations of the force during his first year in overall command was sent in a despatch published in the London Gazette of 21 November 1902. He was knighted as a Knight Commander of the Order of the Bath (KCB) in 1904 and promoted to general on 11 December 1907. The same year he was appointed Military Secretary to the India Office.

Creagh succeeded Lord Kitchener as Commander-in-Chief, India, in 1909, retiring in 1914. During the First World War he served as the military advisor to the Central Association of Volunteer Training Corps. He died at 65 Albert Hall Mansions, London SW9, on 9 August 1923.

Creagh further followed Kitchener in becoming the District Grand Master of Freemasons in the Punjab.

His Victoria Cross is held by the National Army Museum in Chelsea, London, England.

Footnotes

External links
Location of grave and VC medal (Surrey)

 

|-

1848 births
1923 deaths
Military personnel from County Clare
19th-century Irish people
Irish officers in the British Army
People from County Clare
Irish recipients of the Victoria Cross
British Indian Army generals
British military personnel of the Boxer Rebellion
British Commanders-in-Chief of India
Knights Grand Cross of the Order of the Bath
Knights Grand Commander of the Order of the Star of India
Second Anglo-Afghan War recipients of the Victoria Cross
Knights of Grace of the Order of St John
Recipients of the Order of the Rising Sun
Sherwood Foresters officers
Graduates of the Royal Military College, Sandhurst
Bombay Staff Corps officers
Irish Freemasons
Irish knights
British Army generals
British Army personnel of World War I
Members of the Council of the Governor General of India